Saint-Anicet is a municipality in Le Haut-Saint-Laurent Regional County Municipality in the Montérégie administrative region of Quebec. The population as of the Canada 2011 Census was 2,523.

Geography
Saint-Anicet is located in the southwestern Montérégie region of Quebec, on the south shore of the Saint Lawrence River.

Communities
The following locations reside within the municipality's boundaries:
Cazaville – a hamlet in the southern portion of the municipality on Route 132.
Plage-Somerville – a hamlet located on Baie de Somerville in the Saint Lawrence River.
Pointe-Leblanc – a hamlet located along the Saint Lawrence River.
Port Lewis – a hamlet located along the Saint Lawrence River on Route 132.

Lakes and rivers
The following waterways pass through or are situated within the municipality's boundaries:
Rivière La Guerre – runs in a southeast to northwest direction to the Saint Lawrence River.

Demographics

Population

Language

Historic site and museum 

In the south of Saint-Anicet, the Tsiionhiakwatha/Droulers archaeological site interpretation center is where an important Iroquoian village in Quebec was located. Circa 1450, approximately 500 St.Lawrence Iroquoians established a village near the La Guerre River. The centre opened on May 15, 2010.

Droulers-Tsiionhiakwatha was designated a Site du patrimoine constitué under provincial legislation in 2005, and a National Historic Site of Canada in 2007.

See also
 Le Haut-Saint-Laurent Regional County Municipality
 La Guerre River
 List of municipalities in Quebec

References

External links

 Virtual Museum of Canada, The St. Lawrence Iroquoians — virtual exhibit about the St. Lawrence Iroquoian people, based on the archaeological excavations at the Droulers/Tsiionhiakwatha site.

Municipalities in Quebec
Incorporated places in Le Haut-Saint-Laurent Regional County Municipality
Quebec populated places on the Saint Lawrence River